The Long Way to a Small, Angry Planet is the 2014 debut science fiction novel by Becky Chambers, set in her fictional universe the Galactic Commons. Chambers originally self-published it via a Kickstarter campaign; it was subsequently re-published by Hodder & Stoughton.

Synopsis
Fleeing her old life, Rosemary Harper joins the multi-species crew of the Wayfarer as a file clerk, and follows them on their various missions throughout the galaxy.  The novel concerns itself with character development rather than adventure.  Each member of the crew has a story that unfolds, or a crisis to face.  They encounter several alien environments on the slow path to their destination.  At the end, the ship is damaged by hostile aliens, precipitating changes in the relationships between the characters, setting them on new paths.

Characters
 Rosemary Harper – A Martian-born Human, she leaves her home planet to join the crew of the tunneling ship, the Wayfarer, where she works as the ship's clerk, while struggling to cover up her past.
 Ashby Santoso – The Human captain of the Wayfarer who grew up on the Exodus Fleet. Familiar with space-bound life, he keeps the rest of the crew in check.
 Dr Chef – A Grum, who is both the doctor and chef on board the Wayfarer.
 Kizzy Shao – One of the Wayfarer'''s two technicians. Human, extremely talkative.
 Jenks – The Wayfarers other technician. Human and shorter than most people in the Galactic Commons, but chooses not to get this changed.
 Sissix – An Aandrisk, and pilot of the Wayfarer. When she isn't flying the ship, she seems to spend the rest of her time arguing with Corbin.
 Artis Corbin – Human, and the ship's algaeist. With a short temper, and not as friendly as the rest of the crew, he prefers not to leave the algae labs where he grows the Wayfarer'''s fuel.
 Lovelace – Referred to by the crew as Lovey, Lovelace is the Wayfarers onboard AI who runs the processes on the ship and helps during communications.
 Ohan – Sianat Pair, the ship's Navigator, they are able to understand the complexities of the sublayer and direct Sissix on where to go. They keep to themself.

Production
In 2012, Becky Chambers started a crowdfunding campaign on Kickstarter, hoping to raise $2,500 so that she could work half-time for two months to finish the book. She stated her intent to find a regular publisher, but noted that self-publication would be a fallback option.

At the end of February 2013, she announced the book's completion, and acquired a literary agent; the book was published by Hodder & Stoughton in 2015.

Reception
The book was shortlisted for the 2016 Arthur C. Clarke Award, and earned Chambers a nomination for the British Fantasy Awards' 2016 "Sydney James Bounds Award for Best Newcomer". It was the first self-published novel to be shortlisted for the Kitschies Golden Tentacle for Best Debut Novel.

The Guardian called it "a quietly profound, humane tour de force that tackles politics and gender issues with refreshing optimism". Io9 considered it to be "exciting, adventurous, and ... cozy", and comparable to "the best space opera universes".

Adam Roberts felt that it was "a huge amount of space-opera-y fun, with some interestingly nuanced perspectives on gender woven into the whole", while James Nicoll observed that although the setting was evocative of the Traveller roleplaying game, he was "more strongly reminded of James Tiptree, Jr.'s short story "And I Awoke and Found Me Here on the Cold Hill's Side" … that is, if James Tiptree, Jr. instead of being relentlessly, inexorably depressing, had been a cheerful optimist." Strange Horizons Linda Wilson commended Chambers for portraying naturalistic conversation and exposition, and for the relationships between characters.

At the Financial Times, James Lovegrove described it as "SF for the Tumblr generation, a feel-good tale of non-conformity, gender fluidity, multiculturalism and unorthodox sexual relationships", and "perfectly pleasant", but faulted it for "somewhat lacking ... dramatic tension". 
Similarly, Locuss Adrienne Martini stated that although the novel's opening was "catnip for space opera fans", and although she felt that readers will "love these characters and the exquisitely developed universe they inhabit", ultimately "nothing much happens" until the last 40 pages; Martini emphasized, however, that the novel is worth reading because of its characters and worldbuilding. At Tor.com, Niall Alexander noted that although it is not a "balls-to-the-wall blockbuster", and although it has a "simplistic plot (that) can't compete with either the depth and complexity of Chambers' cast of characters or the sense of wonder suggested by her stellar setting," it is nonetheless a "delight" and a "genuine joy"; ultimately, Alexander concluded, the novel "isn't really about the eponymous angry planet—it's about the long way there."

References

Wayfarers series
2014 American novels
2014 science fiction novels
American science fiction novels
Space opera novels
Self-published books
Hodder & Stoughton books
Novels about extraterrestrial life
American LGBT novels
2014 debut novels
LGBT speculative fiction novels